Francis Joseph Mahony  (15 March 1915 – January 2000) was an Australian lawyer and public servant, who served as interim Director-General of Security (head of the Australian Security Intelligence Organisation) for just over five months between 1975 and 1976.

Early life
Mahony was born in Newcastle in 1915, but was orphaned when his mother died the day after his birth and his father was killed in action at the Battle of Passchendaele in Belgium during World War I. He was raised by relatives in Newcastle where he went to school, until he moved to Armidale to attend De La Salle College, where he won a scholarship to the University of Sydney.

Public service career
In 1934, Mahony joined the Commonwealth Public Service, whilst also studying law part-time at the Sydney Law School, from which he graduated in 1940. He joined the Crown Solicitor's Office in 1941, interrupting his public service career in 1943 to serve for eighteen months in the Australian Army. After discharge from the army, he returned to the CSO where he was involved in several high-profile inquiries and commissions including the Royal Commission into the Petrov Affair, an inquiry into the crash of Ansett-ANA Flight 325, and the Royal Commission into the Melbourne–Voyager collision. In 1963, he became Deputy Crown Solicitor.

In 1970, Mahony moved to Canberra to join the office of the federal Attorney-General. He was involved in the administration of legislation and law reform, and represented Australia on the delegation to negotiate improvements to the Geneva Convention on the treatment of prisoners of war.

Following the dismissal of Peter Barbour as Director-General of Security by the Whitlam Government, Mahony was appointed as an interim replacement for Barbour for a brief five-month term until the appointment of Edward Woodward.

From 1979, Mahony was the first President of the Repatriation Review Tribunal until it became the Veterans' Review Board in 1985.

Personal life
Mahony married Moya Sexton in 1936. They had eight children—seven sons and one daughter, with one son predeceasing him. His wife Moya died in 1995.

Honours
Mahony was made an Officer of the Order of the British Empire (OBE) in 1972 for his work as Deputy Secretary of the Attorney-General's Department. In the 1980 New Year Honours, he was made a Companion of the Order of the Bath (CB) for his role as President of the Repatriation Commission.

References

1915 births
2000 deaths
Australian public servants
Directors-General of Security
Sydney Law School alumni
Australian Companions of the Order of the Bath
Australian Officers of the Order of the British Empire
Australian Army soldiers
Australian Army personnel of World War II
People from Newcastle, New South Wales